Amour et confusions is a French film which was released in 1997.

Cast
 Patrick Braoudé: Dan
 Kristin Scott Thomas: Sarah
 Valeria Bruni Tedeschi: Michelle
 Gérard Darmon: Simon
 Jeanne Moreau: Libra
 Michèle Garcia: Madame Villiers
 Ticky Holgado: The sexologist
 Judith El Zein: The hostess

Reception
The film opened in sixth place at the French box office with a gross of 3.9 million Franc from 203 screens. After 3 weeks it had grossed 8 million Franc ($1.5 million).

References

External links 
 

French comedy films
1997 films
Films directed by Patrick Braoudé
1990s French films